Saranya Sasi  (1986 – 9 August 2021) was an Indian actress who worked  in Malayalam and Tamil films and television soap operas.

Early life 
Saranya completed her school education from Jawahar Navodaya Vidyalaya, Kannur and also held a degree in literature from Calicut University.

Career 
She started her career in 2006 in Sooryodayam, a serial directed by Balanchandra Menon which was aired on Doordarshan. She debuted as a lead in Mollywood in 2006 film Chacko Randaman and in Kollywood in 2012 film Pachai Engira Kaathu. During her career, Saranya acted in Malayalam films in the 2010s such as Thalappavu, Chhota Mumbai, Ann Mariya Kalippilanu and Bombay March 12, and in popular television soap operas such as Karuthamuthu, Avakashikal, Harichandanam, Kootukari, Malakhamar and Rahasyam.

Personal life 
Saranya married Binu Xavier in November 2014 but later they divorced.

Illness and death 
In 2012, she was diagnosed with a malignant brain tumor, which did not allow her to continue her acting career. In May 2021, she was hospitalized for COVID-19, which aggravated her health.

She died at a private hospital in Thiruvananthapuram on August 9, 2021, at the age of 35, from cancer and COVID-19 complications.

Filmography

Television

References

External links 

 

1986 births
2021 deaths
Indian actresses
Indian film actors
People from Kannur district
Deaths from cancer in India
Actresses in Malayalam television
Actresses in Malayalam cinema
Actresses in Tamil television
Actresses in Telugu television
Actresses in Tamil cinema
Deaths from brain tumor
Deaths from the COVID-19 pandemic in India